Problema is a genus of skippers in the family Hesperiidae.

Species
Problema byssus (Edwards, 1880)
Problema bulenta (Boisduval & LeConte, 1834)

References

Hesperiini
Hesperiidae genera